"Can't Be Wasting My Time" is the debut single by American contemporary R&B singer  Mona Lisa. The song features a rap from American hip hop group The Lost Boyz.

Music video

The official music video for the song was directed by Brian Luvar.

Track listings
12", 33 RPM, Vinyl
"Can't Be Wasting My Time" (w/ Rap) - 4:34(feat. Lost Boyz)
"Can't Be Wasting My Time" (w/o Rap) - 4:00
"Can't Be Wasting My Time" (Instrumental) - 5:36
"Can't Be Wasting My Time" (Video Version w/ Rap) - 4:14(feat. Lost Boyz)

Personnel
Information taken from Discogs.
artwork – Edward ODowd
production – "Buttnaked" Tim Dawg, Mr. Sex

Chart performance

Notes

External links

1996 songs
1996 debut singles
Lost Boyz songs
Island Records singles
Mona Lisa (singer) songs
Songs written by Johntá Austin
Music videos directed by Brian Luvar